El-Flaye is a town in the Kabylie region in  northern Algeria.It is located in the Wilaya of Béjaïa and is administratively attached to the daïra of Sidi-Aich.

Geography 
El-Flaye is 50 km south-east of Béjaïa.

neighboring municipalities of El-Flaye are:

Tibane, Tinabdher, Sidi-Aich

Souk Oufella, Sidi Ayad

Seddouk, M'cisna.

Transport 
The municipality of El-Flaye has five municipal buses reserved for school transport.Several buses run the El-Flaye - Sidi-Aich route.And three other buses transport the students to the villages of Ait Daoud, Izghad and El Madi.

Public transport users take independent private minibuses.

localities and neighborhoods 
In addition to its capital El-Flaye, the municipality of El-Flaye is made up of the following localities:

El-Flaye, Ait Daoud, Izghad, El Madi et Maakal.

Administration and politics

Economy 
There are many shops dans la commune, and theirs number is increasing.

Everyday life 

 Seat of El-Flaye People's Municipal Assembly;
 Poste office;
 Youth center;
 Girls primary school( now mixed);
 Boys primary school (now mixed);
 Primary school Izghad;
 Primary school Ikherban:
 Primary school Ait Daoud;
 Secondary school Imadali Laarbi;
 Policlinic Vouhouri;
 Traitment room Tiserfine;
 Former Algerian Muslim scoots Association;
 Ecological Association "Le Printemps éternel';
 Help for people with special needs Association "Les anges oubliés"

Personlities 

 Amour Abdenour, born in El-Flaye on February 17, 1952, He is Kabyle Singer.
 Marcel Mouloudji, he is a singer,songwriter, painter and actor.
 Karim Tahar, he is a singer and boxer nicknamed The Kabyle Toni Rossi . 

Communes of Béjaïa Province
Béjaïa Province